One Eyed King is an ensemble crime drama detailing the trials and tribulations of several characters living together in the same Hell's Kitchen neighborhood. Starring Armand Assante, William Baldwin, Jim Breuer, Bruno Kirby, Chazz Palminteri, and Jason Gedrick, the film had its premiere at the 2001 Boston Film Festival.

Premise

Five childhood friends deal with their own hardships in Hell's Kitchen, Manhattan. Their livelihood is tied to a ruthless Irish mob boss. They all soon find themselves tested between their lifelong friendship to each other and their loyalty to a coldblooded killer.

Cast
 William Baldwin as Frankie Thomas
Justin Bradley as Young Frankie Thomas
 Dash Mihok as "Bug"
Gary Fine as Young "Bug"
 Jason Gedrick as Dennis Reilly
Johnny Griffin as Young Dennis Reilly
 Jim Breuer as Patrick "Paddy" O'Donahue
Kevin Woodhouse as Young Patrick "Paddy" O'Donohue
 Josh Hopkins as Chuckie
Mitchell David Rothpan as Young Chuckie
 Chazz Palminteri as Detective Eddie Dugan
 Leo Rossi as Joe "Big Joe" Thomas
 Connie Britton as Helen Reilly
 Amanda Moresco as Kate Thomas
 Catherine Colvey as Marge Reilly
 Thomas Michael as Larry "The Lip"
 Lara Daans as "Cookie"
 Armand Assante as Hollis "Holly" Cone
 Rick Aiello as Terry / The Narrator
 Patrick McGuiness as Junior
 Michel Perron as Freddy "Fat Freddy"
 Bruno Kirby as Mickey
 John Dunn-Hill as "Pops" McCool
 Sheena Larkin as Annie "Blind Annie"

References

External links 
 
 

2001 crime drama films
2001 films
2000s English-language films
Films directed by Robert Moresco